Rudolph Hargrave (February 15, 1925 – April 1, 2014) served as a justice of the Oklahoma Supreme Court from 1978 until his retirement on December 31, 2010. Before being elevated to the highest court, he was a superior court and district judge for Seminole County from 1969 to 1978.

Early life and education
Born February 15, 1925, in Shawnee, Oklahoma, Rudolph Hargrave resided in Wewoka, Seminole County, Oklahoma for most of his life. His parents were John Hubert Hargrave and Daisy (Holmes) Hargrave.  He attended Wewoka public schools, East Central State University in Ada, Oklahoma, and the University of Oklahoma, where he received his law degree in 1949. He was a member of Delta Theta Phi legal fraternity.

Career
He began in private practice in Wewoka after graduation. In 1964, he was elected County Judge for Seminole County, Oklahoma until 1967. From 1967 to 1969, Hargrave was a superior court judge and then a district judge from 1969 to 1978, both in the same county.

On October 10, 1978, Hargrave was appointed to the Oklahoma Supreme Court by Governor David L. Boren, replacing Denver Davison, who had been serving since 1937 as the District 8 justice.  Hargrave was retained in 1989, 1986, and 1992 by the voters for six-year terms. He was elected Chief Justice on January 1, 1989. During his term as Chief, he was elected by the National Conference of Chief Justices as its vice-president, the only Oklahoma justice serve in that position. He was also a member of the Seminole County Bar Association, Oklahoma Bar Association, American Bar Association and the Oklahoma Judicial Conference. Hargrave retired from the court effective December 31, 2010. Governor Brad Henry announced that Judge Douglas L. Combs would replace Hargrave on January 1, 2011.

Personal
Hargrave and his wife, Madeline, had three children, Cindy Keefer of Ada, Oklahoma, John Robert Hargrave of Wewoka, Oklahoma, and Jana Howard of Ardmore, Oklahoma.

Hargrave was a 32nd Degree Mason and belonged to the United Methodist Men's Group.

Death
Hargrave died on April 1, 2014. He was buried in Oakwood Cemetery in Wewoka.

Honors
 Hargrave received the Distinguished Alumnus Award in 1969 from ECU.
The Sovereignty Symposium’s writing awards, the Hargrave Prizes, are named in his honor.
In August, 2013, a moot courtroom in the new ECU Chickasaw Business and Conference Center was named for Judge Hargrave.

Notes

References

1925 births
2014 deaths
Justices of the Oklahoma Supreme Court
People from Shawnee, Oklahoma
People from Wewoka, Oklahoma
University of Oklahoma alumni
East Central University alumni
20th-century American judges